In abstract algebra, a derivative algebra is an algebraic structure of the signature   
    
<A, ·, +, ', 0, 1, D>   
    
where    

<A, ·, +, ', 0, 1>   

is a Boolean algebra and D is a unary operator, the derivative operator, satisfying the identities:    
    
 0D = 0    
 xDD ≤ x + xD    
 (x + y)D = xD + yD.  

xD is called the derivative of x. Derivative algebras provide an algebraic abstraction of the derived set operator in topology. They also play the same role for the modal logic wK4 = K + p∧?p → ??p that Boolean algebras play for ordinary propositional logic.

References   
 Esakia, L., Intuitionistic logic and modality via topology, Annals of Pure and Applied Logic, 127 (2004) 155-170
 McKinsey, J.C.C. and Tarski, A., The Algebra of Topology, Annals of Mathematics, 45 (1944) 141-191

Algebras
Boolean algebra
Topology